Perry High School is a public high school located just southeast of Lima, Ohio.  It is the only high school in the Perry Local Schools district.

External links
 District Website
 Official Website

References

High schools in Allen County, Ohio
Buildings and structures in Lima, Ohio
Public high schools in Ohio